Spermophorides mediterranea is a cellar spider species found in Spain and France.

See also 
 List of Pholcidae species

References

External links 

Pholcidae
Spiders of Europe
Spiders described in 1973